General elections were held in Monaco on 9 February 2003. The result was a victory for the Union for Monaco alliance, which won 21 of the 24 seats in the National Council. Within the alliance 12 seats were won by the Union for the Principality, four by the National Union for the Future of Monaco, three by Promotion of the Monegasque Family and two by Rally for Monaco.

Results

By party

References

Elections in Monaco
Monaco
Parliamentary election
February 2003 events in Europe